Wormser is a surname associated with Worms, Germany. Notable people with the surname include:
André Wormser (1851–1926), French banker and Romantic composer
Baron Wormser (born 1948), American poet
Felix Wormser (died 1981), American engineer and government official
Frances Dewey Wormser (1903–2008), American actress, entertainer, and vaudeville performer
Lewis Wormser Harris (1812-1876), bill-broker, financier, member of Dublin Corporation, and member of the Dublin Hebrew Congregation
Paul Wormser (1905–1944), French fencer
Richard Wormser (1908–1977), American writer
Sekl Loeb Wormser (1768-1846), German rabbi

See also 

Wormser Dom

German-language surnames